There are approximately 60 colleges and universities of various types, not counting branch campuses, in the U.S. state of Indiana. The Higher Learning Commission is the institutional accrediting agency that has historically accredited many colleges and universities in Indiana.

Institutions

Former institutions
 Indiana University–Purdue University Fort Wayne
 MedTech College
 Purdue University Calumet
 Purdue University North Central

 Saint Joseph's College (Rensselaer, Indiana)

See also

 List of college athletic programs in Indiana
 Higher education in the United States
 Lists of American institutions of higher education
 List of recognized higher education accreditation organizations

Notes

References

External links
Department of Education listing of accredited institutions in Indiana

 
Indiana, List of colleges and universities in
Colleges and universities